Puteri Indonesia 2007 (sometimes called Miss Indonesia Universe 2007) is 12th edition of Puteri Indonesia beauty pageant. It was held on 3 August 2007 in Jakarta Convention Center, Jakarta.

The Host of the show is Ferdi Hasan and the First Runner Up of Puteri Indonesia 2004, Nadia Mulya. And Putri Raemawasti from East Java winning this contest and she elected to represent Indonesia to the Miss Universe 2008, Puteri Indonesia Lingkungan is Duma Riris Silalahi from North Sumatra and elected to Miss International 2008, Puteri Indonesia Pariwisata is Ika Fiyonda Putri from Jakarta and elected to Miss Tourism World 2008 (but canceled). The final coronation night was graced by the reigning Miss Universe 2007, Riyo Mori of Japan.

Result
The Crowns of Puteri Indonesia Title Holders
 Puteri Indonesia 2007 (Miss Universe Indonesia 2007) 
 Puteri Indonesia Lingkungan 2007 (Miss International Indonesia 2007)
 Puteri Indonesia Pariwisata 2007 (Miss Tourism Indonesia 2007)

Contestants

 Bali – Fransisca Lidyawati
 Bangka Belitung – Sinta Septia Dewi
 Banten – Resa Puspita Rosliana
 Bengkulu – Rizky Anisa Mutiara
 Central Celebes – Sri Rifka Reski
 Central Java – Elvaretta Nathania Gunawan
 East Borneo – Dinia Marinka
 East Java – Putri Raemawasti
 East Nusa Tenggara – Rakhmania Ordha Wacana Pian
 Gorontalo – Yohanna Syamsia Kamaru
 Jakarta SCR 1 – Bona Dea Kometa
 Jakarta SCR 2 – Tri Handayani
 Jakarta SCR 3 – Fitri Adityasari
 Jakarta SCR 4 – Ika Fiyonda Putri
 Jakarta SCR 5 – Putri Widyasari
 Jakarta SCR 6 – Nona Evita
 Jambi – Silviana Puspita
 Lampung – Indah Mulyati
 Maluku – Evajune Tassa Rieuwpassa
 North Celebes – Ezra Margareth Pelealu
 North Maluku – Masyitah Lating
 North Sumatra – Duma Riris Silalahi
 Papua – Christy Anggeline Jawiraka
 Riau – Wella Mayangsari
 Riau Islands – Masyitah
 South Borneo – Ratih Ayu Wulandari
 South Celebes – Rezki Annisa
 South East Celebes – Yunita Triyana Nasruddin
 South Sumatra – Verawati Agustina
 West Borneo – Yulia Ramadayanti
 West Celebes – Nila Shanty
 West Java – Essy Prita Cinta
 West Nusa Tenggara – Nurfajrina
 West Papua – Theresia Ajeng Pratiwi
 West Sumatra – Milfa Yeni
 Yogyakarta – Denissa Marthatina

References

External links
  Official site

2007
2007 in Indonesia
2007 beauty pageants